Jim Carphin (born October 21, 1938) is a former Canadian football player who played for the BC Lions and Saskatchewan Roughriders. He won the Grey Cup with the Lions in 1964. He played college football at the University of Washington. After his football career, he was a lawyer.

References

1938 births
BC Lions players
Washington Huskies football players
Saskatchewan Roughriders players
Canadian football people from Winnipeg
Players of Canadian football from Manitoba
Canadian players of American football
Living people
Canadian football ends